Lubutana is a genus of parasitic flies in the family Tachinidae.

Species
Lubutana divaricata Villeneuve, 1938
Lubutana mayeri Mesnil, 1955
Lubutana perplexa Mesnil, 1955

References

Diptera of Africa
Exoristinae
Tachinidae genera
Taxa named by Joseph Villeneuve de Janti